Kamsegari (also Romanized as Kamsegarī; also known as Kamseh Garī) is a village in Taftan-e Jonubi Rural District, Nukabad District, Khash County, Sistan and Baluchestan Province, Iran. At the 2006 census, its population was 87, in 28 families.

References 

Populated places in Khash County